Michael Keith Gregory (20 May 1964 – 19 November 2007) was an English professional rugby league footballer, who played in the 1980s and 1990s, and coached in the 1990s and 2000s. He played for Warrington from 1982 to 1994, and won 20 caps for Great Britain. He was the head coach of Wigan Warriors.

Playing career
Gregory was born in Wigan, Lancashire, England. He had a distinguished playing career, captaining both Warrington  and Great Britain.

He made his début for Warrington on Sunday 5 September 1982, and he played his last match for Warrington on Saturday 12 February 1994, making 222 1st team starts and 24 substitute appearances and scoring 45 tries and a total points of 176. Gregory played and scored a try in Warrington's 14-36 defeat by Wigan in the 1990 Challenge Cup Final.

He captained a Great Britain tour to New Zealand. Gregory was selected to go on the 1988 Great Britain tour of Australasia, and scored a try as the Lions upset Australia in the third Ashes test in Sydney. He won 20 caps for Great Britain, and played once for the Rest of the World against Australia, in 1988.

Gregory's testimonial match at Warrington took place in 1994. He is a Warrington Wolves Hall of Fame inductee and Heritage No. 822.

Coaching career
Gregory started his coaching career as assistant to Shaun McRae at St. Helens. He spent three successful seasons at St. Helens between 1996–98, before taking the head coach job at the Swinton Lions. He later joined the Wigan Warriors, taking charge of the Senior Academy in 2001. He led the youngsters to first place in the 2002 Academy Championship, before being promoted to assistant coach for the 2003's Super League VIII. 

Gregory had international coaching experience with Wales in the 1995 World Cup. He also guided the England Academy team to a historic series victory against the Australian Schoolboys in 2002. He was assistant coach of the Lancashire Origin squad for 2003 and was also appointed as head coach of Scotland for the 2003 European Nations' Cup. 
 
Following the departure of the Wigan Warriors' head coach Stuart Raper in July 2003, Gregory was appointed head coach until the end of 2003's Super League VIII. After Raper's announcement, Gregory had announced his intention to run for the job permanently. It was the first time since Colin Clarke in 1985 that a Wigan-born man has coached Wigan. Gregory spent three months as caretaker coach, remaining unbeaten for 11 matches and guiding the Wigan Warriors to the 2003 Super League Grand Final – becoming the first side from outside the top two to make it all the way – before being awarded the job full-time on a 2-year contract. The grand final was lost to the Bradford Bulls.

Illness
In 2004, it became known that Gregory had been suffering from progressive muscular atrophy, a form of motor neuron disease affecting his nerves and muscles which he had possibly contracted as early as 2001. The illness blocks signals from the brain getting to muscles, causing weight-loss and affecting speech. He went to the United States for a week in May 2004 for treatment. Initially it was thought that he had become unwell from an insect bite whilst abroad. Ian Millward was appointed as head coach of the Wigan Warriors while Gregory was still recovering from his illness.

Disagreement with Wigan
In September 2004 there were reports that his illness would prevent him from returning to his job at Wigan. Maurice Lindsay said that Wigan would continue to employ and pay Gregory while he was on sick leave and wait for advice from medical advisers.

Gregory felt that during 2004 he would be able to return but that the club blocked his return to work. He took Wigan and the club's owner Dave Whelan to court, claiming Wigan should have done more to help him carry on. The case was settled out of court with Wigan agreeing to pay Gregory £17,500. After the settlement, Gregory said:

Death and legacy
On 19 November 2007, having used a wheelchair for the previous year, Gregory died aged 43. In 2008, the Rugby Football League (RFL) introduced the Spirit of Rugby League Award to recognise individuals who have made a significant positive contribution to rugby league, with the inaugural award being presented posthumously to Gregory. In subsequent seasons, the award was renamed in his honour to the Mike Gregory Spirit of Rugby League Award.

References

External links
!Great Britain Statistics at englandrl.co.uk (statistics currently missing due to not having appeared for both Great Britain, and England)
(archived by web.archive.org) Mike Gregory website; accessed 1 September 2014.
(archived by web.archive.org) Obituary in The Times, 28 November 2007; accessed 1 September 2014.
(archived by web.archive.org) Hall of Fame at wire2wolves.com accessed 1 September 2014.
Warrington's World Cup heroes – Mike Gregory
(archived by web.archive.org) Online Book of Condolence, me.com; accessed 1 September 2014.

1964 births
2007 deaths
Cronulla-Sutherland Sharks players
Deaths from motor neuron disease
Neurological disease deaths in England
English rugby league coaches
English rugby league players
Great Britain national rugby league team captains
Great Britain national rugby league team players
Place of death missing
Rugby league locks
Rugby league second-rows
Rugby league players from Wigan
Swinton Lions coaches
Warrington Wolves captains
Warrington Wolves players
Wigan Warriors coaches